I'm a Celebrity...Get Me Out of Here! returned for its eighteenth series on 18 November 2018 on ITV, as confirmed by Ant & Dec at the end of the Coming Out show in December 2017.

On 9 August 2018, Anthony McPartlin confirmed that he would not be presenting the then upcoming eighteenth series. On 29 August, it was confirmed that Holly Willoughby would host the eighteenth series with Declan Donnelly whilst McPartlin took a year long break from television. The series opener was watched by just over 14 million people, giving the show its highest rating since the third series in 2004. The show was watched by an average of 12.18 million people a night, making it the most watched series of the show ever.

The series ended on 9 December 2018 and was won by Harry Redknapp, who was crowned the next 'King of the Jungle', becoming the show's oldest winner and the first male winner since Carl Fogarty in 2014. Emily Atack finished as the runner-up.

Trailer
The first teaser trailer was released on 27 October 2018.

Celebrities
The line-up was confirmed on 12 November 2018.

Results and elimination
 Indicates that the celebrity was immune from the vote
 Indicates that the celebrity received the most votes from the public
 Indicates that the celebrity received the fewest votes and was eliminated immediately (no bottom two)
 Indicates that the celebrity was named as being in the bottom two
 Indicates that the celebrity received the second fewest votes and were not named in the bottom two

Notes
 The celebrities split into four teams for a set of challenges to earn immunity; Galahs (Malique, Nick and Sair), Koalas (Anne, Emily and John), Roos (Fleur, Harry and James) and Underdogs (Noel and Rita). The Galahs won, earning immunity. Fleur and John then won immunity after winning an immunity "playoff" round.
 John was excluded from the vote on medical grounds.
 The public voted for who they wanted to win, rather than save.

Bushtucker trials
The contestants take part in daily trials to earn food. These trials aim to test both physical and mental abilities. The winner is usually determined by the number of stars collected during the trial, with each star representing a meal earned by the winning contestant for their camp mates.
 
 The public voted for who they wanted to face the trial
 The contestants decided who would face the trial
 The trial was compulsory and neither the public nor celebrities decided who took part

Notes
 Anne was excluded from the trial on medical grounds.
 Only campmates from Snake Rock were eligible for this trial, as a result of losing the entry challenge.
 As part of the "inner circle", Fleur, Harry and Sair were immune from the trial, as was "Emperor of the Jungle", Noel.
 This was not a star trial, instead, the celebrities were competing to win time for James, John and Rita, who were competing in a quest to win a feast for the camp.
 John did not attend the trial, so his star was taken by Fleur.

Star count

Dingo Dollar challenges
Members from camp will take part in the challenge to win 'Dingo Dollars'. If they win them, they can then take the dollars to the 'Outback Shack', where they can exchange them, for camp luxuries. Kiosk Kev will ask them a question. Two options are given, and the celebrities can choose which they would like to win. However, to win their luxury, a question is asked to the celebrities still in camp via the telephone box. If the question is answered correctly, the celebrities can take the items back to camp. If wrong, they receive nothing and Kiosk Kev will close the shack, and the celebrities will leave empty handed.
 
 The celebrities got the question correct
 The celebrities got the question wrong
 

 Luxury items included Emily's hairbrush, Harry's chair, Noel's beard dye and Rita's eye mask.

Ratings
Official ratings are taken from BARB, utilising the four-screen dashboard which includes viewers who watched the programme on laptops, smartphones, and tablets within 7 days of the original broadcast.

References

External links
 

18
2018 in British television
2018 British television seasons